Charles Strong (1844–1942) was Australian preacher.

Charles or Charlie Strong may also refer to:

 Charles Augustus Strong (1862–1940), American psychologist
 Charlie Strong (born 1960), American college football coach
 Charlie Strong (Peaky Blinders), a character in Peaky Blinders
 Charles S. Strong (1906–1962), American author
 Charles Strong (priest), Irish Anglican priest
 Charles Strong, a lynching victim on January 17, 1922